László Gyurovszky is former Minister of Construction and Regional Development of Slovakia. He graduated  at Faculty of Electrical Engineering of the Slovak Technical College (currently known as Slovak University of Technology). After studies, he worked in chemical industry, in Duslo Šaľa. He began politically active in 1990, when he joined Independent Hungarian Initiative - Hungarian Civic Party as a head of election campaign and spokesman of movement.

External links 
 https://web.archive.org/web/20070816054224/http://www.government.gov.sk/english/minister_mvrr.html (page about current minister, archived version about László Gyurovszky)

References 

1959 births
Living people
People from Šaľa
Hungarians in Slovakia
Party of the Hungarian Community politicians
Slovak University of Technology in Bratislava alumni
Members of the National Council (Slovakia) 1998-2002
Members of the National Council (Slovakia) 2006-2010